The Office of Federal Procurement Policy (OFPP) is a component of the United States Office of Management and Budget (OMB), which is part of the Executive Office of the President of the United States (EOP). OFPP provides overall direction for government-wide procurement procedures and "to promote economy, efficiency, and effectiveness in acquisition processes." OFPP is headed by an Administrator who is appointed by the President and confirmed by the Senate. In February 2018, President Donald Trump nominated Michael E. Wooten to be the next Administrator. Dr. Wooten was confirmed on August 1, 2019.

OFPP has encouraged agencies to make purchases jointly, for efficiency reason.

History 
OFPP was established by law in 1974 to guide federal-government-wide procurement policies, regulations and procedures.

See also 

Government procurement
Federal Acquisition Regulation
Federal Procurement Data System
Government procurement in the United States
Top 100 Contractors of the U.S. federal government
Sustainable procurement

References 

United States Office of Management and Budget